Ángel Ayala Lardizabal (born 11 May 2000) is a Mexican professional boxer who held the WBC FECARBOX flyweight title in 2021.

Professional career
Ayala made his professional debut against Christopher Celaya on 7 March 2019. He won the fight by a second-round technical knockout. Ayala amassed an 8–0 record before being booked to face Luis Castro for the vacant WBC FECARBOX flyweight title on 16 October 2020. He captured the first major title of his professional career by a second-round knockout. Ayala made his first regional title defense against Jeovani Gonzalez on 22 January 2022, on the undercard of the Hector Flores and Juan Carlos Parra light flyweight bout. He won the fight by a dominant unanimous decision, with all three judges awarding Ayala a 100–88 scorecard.

Ayala faced the overmatched Brandon "Gallardo" Vargas (3–2–1) for the vacant ABF Continental Americas flyweight title on 30 April 2021. He won the fight by technical decision. The bout was stopped after the seventh round, due to rainfall.

His eleven-fight undefeated streak earned Ayala the chance to face Cristofer Rosales in a WBC flyweight title eliminator. It was scheduled as the main event of an Azteca 7 broadcast card, which took place at Centro de Espectáculos del Recinto Ferial in Metepec, Mexico on 9 April 2022. He won the fight by unanimous decision. Two of the judges scored the fight 116–111 in his favor, while the third judge awarded him a much wider 120–107 scorecard.

Ayala faced Miguel Angel Herrera on 23 July 2022, once again in the main event of an Azteca 7 broadcast card. He needed just 79 seconds to hand Herrera the first stoppage loss of his career. The bout was stopped due to a cut on Herrera's left eyelid.

Professional boxing record

References

External links
 

Living people
2000 births
Mexican male boxers
Flyweight boxers
Super-flyweight boxers
Boxers from the State of Mexico
People from Texcoco, State of Mexico